The London Film Awards is an annual awards ceremony started in 2012, recognising the work of independent film and brightest contemporary filmmakers/ screenwriters around the world. The festival honours films and screenplays from over 70 countries around the world, the London Film Awards features over 20 competition categories including Feature Films, Short Films, Documentaries, Student Films, Animation, Television Advertisements, Music Videos, and a screenwriting competition.

The Grand Prize Winners of each official competition category, as determined by an Official Jury, receive the Gold Lion Award. Additionally, the London Film Awards offers various Special Achievement Awards for 'standout' productions.

2017 London Film Award Winners

Grand Jury Prize - The Activists: War, Peace, and Politics in the Streets directed by Melody Shemtov

Special Jury Prize - Cotton Wool directed by Nicholas Connor

Best Experimental Film - Sirocco: Prophecy of Wind directed by John Taschner

Best Animated Film - Ghost Beats directed by Brent Barson

Best Screenplay - An Old Man of the Hills, and the Schoolmaster's Story directed by Harry Pearson

Best British Film - Our Little Haven directed by Ben Rider

Competition categories
Narrative Feature
Narrative Short (under 40 minutes)
Documentary Feature
Documentary Short (under 40 minutes)
Animated Film
Experimental Film
Film Directing
First-Time Director
Student Film
Web Video
Television Commercial
Music Video
Television Pilot
British Film
Screenplay: Feature Screenplay
Screenplay: Short Screenplay
Screenplay: Stage Plays
Screenplay: First-Time Screenwriter
Screenplay: Television Pilot
Acting / Performance: Actor
Acting / Performance: Actress
Acting / Performance: Supporting Actor
Acting / Performance: Supporting Actress

References

Film festivals in London
Short film festivals in the United Kingdom